Frank Bernard "Beauty" McGowan (November 8, 1901 – May 6, 1982) was an American professional baseball player, an outfielder who appeared in 375 games over five seasons (1922–1923; 1928–1929; 1937) in Major League Baseball for the Philadelphia Athletics, St. Louis Browns and Boston Bees.

McGowan spent the intervening seasons as a stalwart in minor league baseball.  He played all or parts of 13 seasons in the top-level International League — largely with the minor league edition of the Baltimore Orioles, but also with the Newark Bears and Buffalo Bisons — and was a member of the inaugural class (1947) of the International League Hall of Fame.  McGowan was a slugger in the minors, once hitting 37 home runs for the Orioles.

After retiring from the field, he became a long-time scout for the Baltimore Orioles of the American League, the former St. Louis Browns franchise.  He died in Hamden, Connecticut, at age 80.

External links

1901 births
1982 deaths
Baltimore Orioles (IL) managers
Baltimore Orioles (IL) players
Baltimore Orioles scouts
Baseball players from Connecticut
Boston Bees players
Buffalo Bisons (minor league) players
Kansas City Blues (baseball) players
Major League Baseball outfielders
Milwaukee Brewers (minor league) players
Minneapolis Millers (baseball) players
Newark Bears (IL) players
New Haven Weissmen players
Philadelphia Athletics players
St. Louis Browns players
International League MVP award winners
People from Branford, Connecticut